Virtual Maintenance Training is a type of training method that includes computer-based interactive 3D simulations of virtual equipment that replicates the actual real life vehicle or device. It safely teaches vehicle and device crewmembers the procedures to properly service, repair, and maintain equipment. It is the learning method commonly used by training schools and centers of the United States Armed Forces for the maintenance of its defense vehicles. Its integration into current training courses has continued to increase in popularity.

History 

Virtual maintenance training resulted from a need to practice maintenance and repair procedures to hazardous or unavailable equipment within a safe, but realistic environment. 

The earliest mention of a repair and maintenance mission, with a virtual aspect, was conducted by the NASA in December 1993. This mission used virtual environment technology to construct a model of the Hubble Space Telescope and its components that were replaced or serviced.

One of the earliest virtual maintenance trainers resulted from the work completed by American Systems Corporation and The DiSTI Corporation. DiSTI developed the first full 3-D virtual interface maintenance trainer for the U.S. Navy F/A-18C Hornet Fighter Jet, which was delivered in 2006. It was the first trainer that did not use actual hardware to train students. Titled the Simulated Aircraft Maintenance Trainer (SAMT), it contains a physical cockpit simulator and a virtual F/A-18 (including a virtual cockpit) displayed either on two 61-inch touch screens or a PC. With high fidelity 3D interactive graphics, the SAMT trainer feels like a video game and engages the student in “natural navigation” by moving in virtual space. The SAMT trainer significantly improved student throughput and was found to typically reduce overall training cost by 30 to 60 percent.

Operational Benefits 
As with most training simulators, the implementation of virtual maintenance training into a training program provide benefits such as: 
 Reduces Cost: associated cost with hands-on training that use the real world vehicle or device, including lower life cycle costs
 Ensures Safety: the student is safe from injury and the craft is safe from potential damage that may occur during physical hands-on training
 Increases Student Throughput: engages the student in new interactive learning methods by mixing a game-like atmosphere
 Easily Accessible: the student can always have access to the courseware
 Adaptability: can train students through a wider variety of scenarios that can be easily reset
 Aids Instructor Functionality: instructors can easily monitor students
 Team Training Capabilities: allows students on individual computers or systems to interact with each other and simultaneously undertake a maintenance training task

Prevalence and Industries
The implementation of virtual maintenance trainers has slowly gained prevalence with the commercial airline industry, military training, and modern vehicles. Particularly within the airline industry, inspection and maintenance for an aircraft is said to be approximately 90% of a visual nature, but still needs to be performed effectively, efficiently and consistently over time. As the idea of virtual reality began to advance, maintenance training for aircraft became one of the first to receive an augmented reality in task training procedures. 

The idea of using virtual maintenance training or virtual reality in the industrial and energy industry has been a topic of discussion within recent years. This interest is due to the operations and maintenance procedures performed are in high risk environments, such as nuclear power plants or high cost and high yield production plants. The potential use of virtual training in this industry has been stated to be motivated by the favorable experiences that are realized from engineering education, visualization of the complex environments presented in CAD, its perceived usefulness in the assembly process, and applications that follow a "learn-by-doing" approach. The "learn-by-doing" approach encompasses two significant parts: the personal experience through the simulated real-world and the unique training process.

Virtual maintenance training programs can be seen in great numbers among the military simulation and training industry, even though are not completely accepting of the idea of virtual training. It has been noted, however, that a key benefit to using virtual maintenance training is the ability to train on the device or vehicle prior to the real-world counterpart. This benefit was seen by Eglin Air Force Base in 2012, as the 35 Fighter Wing maintainers were able to begin their training courses prior to the actual F-35 aircraft being delivered.

Future of Virtual Maintenance Trainers
With the advent of sophisticated gaming technology in recent years, virtual maintenance trainers and innovative training technologies are becoming increasingly vital to adequately meet the nature of trainees. The idea to keep 3D interactive trainers prevalent is especially true within the U.S. Military, in which virtual training technology (sometimes called “soft trainers”) are implemented alongside training on an actual device or vehicle. However one of the challenges to ensure the sustainability of virtual maintenance trainers, especially those implemented in military training schools, is the placement of sufficient funding to continually update trainers with new technology as it is released.

Notes 

Virtual learning environments